Ingram Canyon is a valley or canyon where the upper reach of Ingram Creek runs in Stanislaus County, California. 	

The upper reach of Ingram Creek runs through Ingram Canyon.

References 

Valleys of Stanislaus County, California
Diablo Range
Geography of the San Joaquin Valley